Hydraulic Shock may refer to:
Water hammer, a pressure surge caused by a fluid suddenly changing velocity
Hydrostatic shock, a hypothesized phenomenon by which pressure waves from a high-speed projectile entering a victim cause injury away from an entry wound